Chaetodiadema keiense is a species of sea urchins of the family, Diadematidae. Their armour is covered with spines. Chaetodiadema keiense was first scientifically described in 1939 by Ole Theodor Jensen Mortensen.

See also 

 Chaetodiadema granulatum
 Chaetodiadema japonicum
 Chaetodiadema pallidum

References 

Animals described in 1939
Diadematidae
Taxa named by Ole Theodor Jensen Mortensen